Kamaro is a village and deh in Badin taluka of Badin District, Sindh. As of 2017, it has a population of 3,429, in 673 households. It is the seat of a tapedar circle, which also includes the villages of Bakho Khudi, Chanesri, and Ret.

References

Populated places in Badin District